Yeniseysk-15 was the site of a disputed Soviet phased array radar near Yeniseysk in Krasnoyarsk Krai, Siberia. The never operational Daryal radar installation was demolished in 1989 after the United States claimed it was in breach of the Anti-Ballistic Missile Treaty.

Daryal radar

The system is a VHF system operating at a wavelength of 1.5 to 2 meters (150 to 200 MHz).

Originally, at least seven Daryal facilities were planned, however, only the first two facilities completed, Pechora and Gabala, were ever operational. Two other Daryal-U type were to be built at Balkhash and Mishelevka, Irkutsk, neither were completed before the collapse of the Soviet Union.

Location
The Soviet Union started a programme to replace all Dnepr (NATO: Hen House) radars with the intention that this would be complete by the mid 1990s  and five Daryals were under construction by 1983. The early warning system had a gap as it did not cover submarine launches of ballistic missiles in the Pacific Ocean. A radar site was needed that would face north east covering this area. The 1972 anti-ballistic missile treaty placed restrictions on the location of early warning radars. Article VI b) states that the United States and the Soviet Union agree:

not to deploy in the future radars for early warning of strategic ballistic missile attack except at locations along the periphery of its national territory and oriented outward.

Initially the manufacturers recommended two sites, Norilsk and Yakutsk, both of which were compliant with the treaty. They were overruled by the Ministry of Defence on cost grounds  and Yeniseysk was selected despite being  from the border. It was believed that Yeniseysk, being inland, would provide the coverage of two radars further out. It is also closer to the Siberian industrial region which would make it cheaper as it has good railway and power infrastructure nearby.

Controversy
The Soviet Union announced that the new radar was for space surveillance rather than for early warning of missile attack, and hence was compliant with the ABM treaty. The radar was given the designation OS-3 (OS-1 was Mishelevka and OS-2 Balkhash) rather than an RO- designation which would be associated with an early warning site. However the radar appeared to be a Daryal radar which were used for ballistic missile early warning as well as space surveillance.

The United States complained and construction was halted in 1987. In 1989 the Soviet Union admitted that it was a breach of the treaty and it was demolished.

References

Russian Space Forces
Russian and Soviet military radars
Military installations of the Soviet Union
Soviet Union–United States relations
Demolished buildings and structures in Russia
Buildings and structures demolished in 1989